Callona championi is a species of beetle in the family Cerambycidae. It was first seen and described by Bates in 1885.

References

Callona
Beetles described in 1885